James Ferdinand Douglas Paxton (born c. 1831) was a Scottish professional golfer who played in the mid-19th century. Paxton placed tenth in the 1863 Open Championship.

Early life
Paxton was born in Scotland circa 1831.

Golf career

1863 Open Championship
The 1863 Open Championship was the fourth Open Championship and was again held at Prestwick Golf Club. Eight professionals and six amateurs contested the event in wet and windy weather, with Willie Park, Sr. winning the championship for the second time, by two shots from Tom Morris, Sr. Paxton had steady rounds of 65-65-66=196 and finished in tenth place.

Death
Paxton's date of death is unknown.

References

Scottish male golfers
1831 births
Year of death missing